Benjamin Harrison (1833–1901) was the president of the United States from 1889 to 1893.

Benjamin Harrison may also refer to:

Persons
 Benjamin Harrison I (1594–1677), first member of the Harrison family of Virginia to live in America
 Benjamin Harrison II (1645–1712), American Virginia politician
 Benjamin Harrison III (1673–1710), Virginia colonial politician, Speaker of the Virginia House of Burgesses
 Benjamin Harrison IV (1693–1745), Virginia colonial politician, member of the Virginia House of Burgesses
 Benjamin Harrison V (1726–1791), signer of the American Declaration of Independence
 Benjamin Harrison VI (1755–1799), American merchant, planter, politician, and revolutionary
 Benjamin Harrison (hospital administrator) (1771–1856), treasurer of Guy's Hospital in London
 Benjamin Harrison (judge) (1888–1960), United States federal judge
 Benjamin Harrison (major general) (born 1928), American military leader notable for his contributions to the tactics of modern airmobile warfare
 Benjamin Harrison (priest) (1808–1887), Anglican clergyman and ecclesiastical administrator
 Benjamin Ahr Harrison, co-host of the Star Trek focused podcast The Greatest Generation

Other
 Fort Benjamin Harrison, a U.S. Army barracks near Indianspolis, Indiana, United States
 Benjamin Harrison (Niehaus), a 1908 public artwork by Charles Henry Niehaus
 Bust of Benjamin Harrison, a 2008 bust of President Harrison by Richard Peglow
 SS Benjamin Harrison, a 1942 World War II Liberty ship

See also
 Ben Harrison (disambiguation)
 
 

Harrison, Benjamin